Noureddine Gharsalli (born 11 August 1955) is a Tunisian professional football manager, and former player.

Career

As a player 
He played for AS Kasserine.

As a manager 
He coached AS Kasserine, ES Zarzis, AS Gabès, and ES Métlaoui.
Since 2011, he has been coaching the Djibouti national football team.

References

External links
Profile at Soccerway.com
Profile at Soccerpunter.com

1955 births
Living people
Tunisian football managers
Expatriate football managers in Djibouti
Djibouti national football team managers
Place of birth missing (living people)
Tunisian expatriate football managers
Tunisian expatriate sportspeople in Djibouti